Beatfish were a short lived Australian dance duo consisting of James Freud and Martin Plaza.

Discography

Albums

Singles

References

Musical groups from Sydney
1990 establishments in Australia
1992 disestablishments in Australia
Musical groups established in 1990
Musical groups disestablished in 1992